Neva Pilgrim (born in Minnesota, United States) is an American soprano known for her work in the performance of contemporary classical music.

She grew up on a farm in Cottonwood County in southwestern Minnesota, near Bingham Lake, between Mountain Lake and Windom.  She graduated magna cum laude from Hamline University, received a Master of Music degree from Yale University, and studied at the Vienna Academy of Music on a Ditson Fellowship.  She has worked closely with many composers, including Pierre Boulez, Lukas Foss, Luciano Berio, George Rochberg, R. Murray Schafer, Ralph Shapey, Richard Wernick, Luigi Dallapiccola, Gunther Schuller, and Steven Stucky.

Pilgrim has sung as a soloist with the Chicago Symphony, Syracuse Symphony, Binghamton Symphony, New York Philharmonic, Brooklyn Philharmonic, Northeastern Philharmonic, and the St. Paul Chamber Orchestra.

She has released over 20 recordings and is one of the three founding members of the Society for New Music, which was established in Syracuse, New York in 1971.  She is an artist-in-residence at Colgate University and has a private studio in New York City.

Among her awards are a Martha Baird Rockefeller grant, NEA and Fromm Foundation commission grants. She has also received a Certificate of Merit for her significant contribution to the field of music from the Yale School of Music, an outstanding alumni award from Hamline University, and the Laurel Leaf Award from the American Composers Alliance (1994).

She has lived in Syracuse, New York for 35 years.

References

External links
Faculty page from Colgate University site
 Interview with Neva Pilgrim by Bruce Duffie, August 22, 2003

Audio
Neva Pilgrim interview by Philip Blackburn, from Innova site (MP3)

Year of birth missing (living people)
Living people
University of Music and Performing Arts Vienna alumni
American sopranos
People from Cottonwood County, Minnesota
Yale University alumni
Musicians from Minnesota
Musicians from Syracuse, New York
20th-century American women opera singers
21st-century American women